Sikri is a village and gram panchayat located in the Sant Kabir Nagar district of Uttar Pradesh state, India. 

Bansi, Naugarh, Mehdawal, Khalilabad and Gorakhpur are the nearby cities to Sikri.

Demographics
As of 2011 India census Sikri had a population of 1,811. Males constituted 913 of the population and females 898. Sikri has an average literacy rate of 50.96% lower than state average of 67.68%. Male literacy is 59.19% and female literacy is 43.03%. In Sikri 19.82% of the population is under 6 years of age.

References

Villages in Sant Kabir Nagar district